Yao Yan is the name of:

Yao Yan (badminton) (born 1974), Chinese badminton player
Yao Yan (table tennis) (born 1988), Chinese table tennis player